is a Japanese professional golfer.

Masuda plays on the Japan Golf Tour, where he has won once.

Professional wins (4)

Japan Golf Tour wins (1)

Japan Challenge Tour wins (1)

Other wins (2)
2003 Hokkaido Open
2004 Hokkaido Open

External links

Japanese male golfers
Japan Golf Tour golfers
Sportspeople from Chiba Prefecture
1973 births
Living people